Masataka Yanagida (born 4 June 1979, in Tokyo) is a Japanese racing driver.

Career
The son of successful racing driver Haruhito Yanagida, a runner-up in the Japanese Touring Car Championship, Masataka began his career in karting in 1993. In 1997 he raced in Formula Renault Campus in France, before stepping up to the main French Formula Renault Championship in 1998. He moved on to Formula Dream in 1999, taking five victories in the 2000 season.

In 2001 he began racing in Japanese F3 and Japanese GT. He finished seventh in the F3 standings and fourth in the GT300 class in Japanese GT, where he raced with Yuji Ide. He improved to finish third in GT300 in 2002, before winning the class in 2003. He returned to F3 in 2004, but could only finish 10th. He moved up to the GT500 class of Super GT in 2005, finishing fifth in the standings, sharing with Michael Krumm.

He made his World Touring Car Championship debut at the 2010 FIA WTCC Race of Japan at Okayama for the Wiechers-Sport team.

Racing record

Complete Super GT results

* Season still in progress

References

External links

Official website 
Career statistics at Driver Database

Living people
1979 births
Sportspeople from Tokyo
Japanese racing drivers
French Formula Renault 2.0 drivers
Japanese Formula 3 Championship drivers
Super GT drivers
Formula Nippon drivers
World Touring Car Championship drivers
Blancpain Endurance Series drivers
24 Hours of Spa drivers
Asian Le Mans Series drivers
24H Series drivers
Formule Campus Renault Elf drivers
Nismo drivers
Kondō Racing drivers